"Losing It" is a song by English producer Chris Lake and Australian producer Fisher, released as a standalone single on 13 July 2018 through Catch & Release (via Insomniac Music Group) and Astralwerks. It was a commercial success, reaching number one on the Australian Club Tracks chart and the US Dance Club Songs chart, and also charted in Flanders and the top 25 of the US Dance/Electronic Songs chart. It was nominated for Best Dance Recording at the 61st Annual Grammy Awards, held in February 2019. It was ranked at number 2 in Australian youth broadcaster Triple J's Hottest 100 of 2018.

Background
After Fisher performed the track in one of two sets he performed at the Coachella Valley Music and Arts Festival in 2017, the song became widely bootlegged by other DJs, so Fisher officially released the track himself in July 2018. The ABC said the track has a "throbbing bass-aided beat".

Critical reception
Billboard ranked "Losing It" third among the 30 best Dance/Electronic songs picked by its Dance/Electronic writing staff in its 2018 year-end review. Writer Kat Bein notes, "You couldn't go to a dance music festival in 2018 without hearing this song's booming bass drop and catchy vocal some 50 times. [...] Everyone from David Guetta to Paul van Dyk and Afrojack has thrown it into their sets, helping turn the collective creative tide toward a deeper, more minimal headspace."

Billboard also placed "Losing It" 84th out of the 100 Best Songs released in 2018 as picked by its Hot 100 staff. Writer David Rishty notes that "The intoxicating house single has been played out by hundreds of touring acts, including Skrillex and Tiësto, in addition to BBC Radio 1 curators like Annie Nightingale and MistaJam. The song has also spent a whopping 15 weeks and counting on Billboards Hot Dance/Electronic Songs chart and continues to rise through the ranks, so we're likely going to be losing it to this one well into 2019."

It has the record of being the track that spent the most time in the 1st position of the Beatport Top 100 (62 days).

The Dave Winnel (producer) 'For The Win' Remix was also very popular in the sets of DJs such as Armin van Buuren, Tiësto and Nicky Romero.

Charts

Weekly charts

Year-end charts

Revenue
By the end of 2022, the song had been played over 400 million times on Spotify, and other platforms, which means this track has likely generated over $1 million dollars in revenue.

Certifications

Awards

See also
 List of number-one club tracks of 2018 (Australia)
 List of number-one dance singles of 2018 (U.S.)

References

2018 singles
2018 songs
Fisher (musician) songs